Burgerbrug is a village in the Dutch province of North Holland. It is a part of the municipality of Schagen, and lies about 14 km north of Alkmaar.

The village was first mentioned in 1840 as "Burgerbrug of Eenigenburgerbrug", and is named after the bridge over the Groote Slot. Burgerbrug was settled soon after the polder was created in 1597. It is a cross shaped settlement with one part along the Groote Sloot and the other part along the road.

The Catholic Birth of Out Lady Church is an aisleless church built in 1866 as a replacement of the clandestine church. Burgerbrug was home to 185 people in 1840. Three polder mills are still present in Burgerbrug. Two of the windmills probably date from 1597.

Gallery

References

Schagen
Populated places in North Holland